Linda Florkevich (married name: Gilmour) (born February 3, 1970 in Kelowna, British Columbia) is a Canadian figure skater who competed in ladies singles.

Biography
Linda Florkevich was born in Kelowna, British Columbia, Canada in 1970. Her figure skating started when she was 4 years old.

Linda's first success was gold at the Canada Winter Games (Saguenay/Lac Saint-Jean, Quebec) as a Novice in 1983. 
Then she moved on to win a Junior National bronze medal (1985) and finally she captured the bronze medal at the Senior National level in 1987.

Her biggest international success is the bronze medal at the 1986 World Junior Figure Skating Championships.

As a professional skater, she has skated with Canada Ice Dance Theatre.

After her competitive days were completed she turned to coaching young talents to reach their goals. Linda is a NCCP (National Coaching Certification Program) level 3 certified coach. She is developing talents from the learn-to-skate programs of CanSkate to National level competitors and work together with individual skaters to choreograph creative skills, interpretive and singles programs.

Competitive highlights

Personal life
She is married to Dean Gilmour and they have two sons, Nathan and Braiden. Braiden, the younger son, was born in 1998 with cerebral palsy. The first diagnosis was that he would not walk or see. Later he was diagnosed with autism as well. After years of hard work, passion and commitment he can read, walk and complete races.

Florkevich and her family support Braiden as he participates in running races and donates his pledges for support to local charities that support kids with physical disabilities and autism. They have hosted charity hockey challenges, social evenings and a very special New Year's Day Charity Ice Show. His mother hopes that Braiden's story will be an inspiration to all people with disabilities to create their own miracles and realize there are no limits to what can be achieved. Braiden’s ‘INSPIRING POSSIBILITIES’ mission supports Variety, the Children's Charity along with Victoria Riding for the Disabled Association.

References

1970 births
Canadian female single skaters
Living people
Sportspeople from Kelowna
World Junior Figure Skating Championships medalists